Darn may refer to:

Darning, a sewing technique
Darn, a minced oath for "damn"

See also 

Phil Darns (born 1959), American football player